The Albanian National Road Race Championships have been held since 1998.

Multiple winners
Men

Men

U23

See also
Albanian National Time Trial Championships
National Road Cycling Championships

References

National road cycling championships
Cycle races in Albania
Recurring sporting events established in 1998
1998 establishments in Albania